GPW may refer to:
 Ford GPW, an automobile
 Government Polytechnic Hindupur or Government Polytechnic For Women, Hindupur (GPW Hindupur), Hindupur, Andhra Pradesh, India
 Grand Prix Wrestling, a defunct Canadian professional wrestling
 Grand Pro Wrestling, a British professional wrestling promotion
 the Great Patriotic War (1941-1945)
 Warsaw Stock Exchange

See also
Ground proximity warning system